Louise Prockter is a planetary scientist and former supervisor of the Planetary Exploration Group at the Johns Hopkins University's Applied Physics Laboratory. In 2016 the Universities Space Research Association (USRA) announced the appointment of Prockter as Director of the Lunar and Planetary Institute (LPI) in Houston, Texas, effective September 6, 2016. She was the first woman to serve as LPI Director and led the LPI from 2016 to 2020. She is currently Chief Scientist, Space Exploration Sector, at the Johns Hopkins University Applied Physics Laboratory.

Education
Prockter did her undergraduate work at Lancaster University in England and got her master's degree from Brown University. She went on to get Ph.D. in planetary geology at Brown University in 1999.

Career
Prockter has worked on a number of NASA missions, both formally and informally. She was on the imaging team for the Galileo Europa Mission (GEM), the Near Earth Asteroid Rendezvous (NEAR) mission, and the MErcury Surface, Space Environment, GEochemistry and Ranging (MESSENGER) mission to Mercury. For the MESSENGER mission, she has served as the Instrument Scientist for the Mercury Dual Imaging System, Co-Investigator, and Deputy Project Scientist.
Prockter is Principal Investigator for Trident, a flyby mission to Triton, one of four mission concepts selected for further study under NASA's ninth Discovery-class mission call.

References

Living people
Planetary scientists
Women planetary scientists
Alumni of Lancaster University
Brown University alumni
Johns Hopkins University faculty
Year of birth missing (living people)
Lunar and Planetary Institute